Thimka is a village situated near Alamgarh in the district of Gujrat, Pakistan.

References

Villages in Gujrat District